Oates Bank is a submarine bank off the coast of Oates Land. The name, in association with Oates Coast, was proposed by Dr. Steven C. Cande, Scripps Institution of Oceanography. Name approved 9/97 (ACUF 272).

See also
Somov Sea

References

Undersea banks of the Southern Ocean